Gus Crystal is a Russian crystal manufacturer. The company is the oldest surviving manufacturer of Russian crystal and was founded in 1756 on the Gus River. The company gave its name to the town of Gus-Khrustalny and its district. Founded by Akim Maltsov, а merchant from Oryol region. From 2013 work as Gusevskaya Crystal Plant named after Akim Maltsov.

References

External links
Official website of the Gus Crystal plant 
Official website of the Administration of the Gus-Khrustalny city

Drinkware
Glassmaking companies
Companies established in 1756
Manufacturing companies of Russia
Russian brands
Companies nationalised by the Soviet Union
Companies based in Vladimir Oblast
Manufacturing companies established in 1856